Gavino is a male given name. It is common in Sardinia. Despite its form, it is unrelated to Gavin, dating back to ancient Latin (meaning "from Gabii"). Saint Gavinus (San Gavino, Porto Torres, Sardinia) was an early Christian martyr, an ex-Roman centurion decapitated in 300 AD, whose head was thrown in the Mediterranean Sea before being reunited with his body.

People with the given name 
 Gavino Angius (born 1946), Italian politician
 Gabino Bugallal Araújo (1861–1932), Spanish politician
 Gavino Contini (1855–1915), Sardinian-Italian poet
 Gabino Coria Peñaloza (1881–1975), Argentine poet and lyricist
 Gavino Gabriel (1881–1980), Italian composer and musicologist
 Gavino Ledda (born 1938), Italian writer and scholar
 Gavino Matta (1910–1954), Italian boxer
 Gabino Sosa (1899–1971), Argentine football player

See also 
 Gavinus
 San Gavino (disambiguation)

References 

Italian masculine given names
Spanish masculine given names